Pense may refer to:

Rural Municipality of Pense No. 160, Saskatchewan, Canada
Pense, Saskatchewan, a village in Saskatchewan, Canada
Lydia Pense, an American rock-soul-jazz singer

See also
Pence (disambiguation)